Bradley Jay Little (born February 15, 1954) is an American politician serving as the 33rd governor of Idaho since January 2019. A member of the Republican Party, he served as the 42nd lieutenant governor of Idaho from 2009 to 2019 and as an Idaho state senator from 2001 to 2009.

Little is a graduate of the University of Idaho, having earned a Bachelor of Science degree in 1976. He has been involved in public service since the 1980s. Little was appointed as an Idaho state senator by governor Dirk Kempthorne in 2001, a position he held for just under eight years. During his senate seating, Little chaired the majority caucus and represented the 8th and (after redistricting in 2002) 11th legislative districts. In 2009, Governor Butch Otter appointed Little to the office of lieutenant governor after the previous lieutenant governor, Jim Risch, resigned to become a United States Senator.

After Otter declined to run for a fourth term, Little ran for governor in the 2018 gubernatorial election and defeated Democratic nominee Paulette Jordan. He was reelected in 2022 with 60.5% of the vote, defeating Democratic nominee Stephen Heidt and Independent candidate Ammon Bundy.

Early life and education 
Little was born and raised in Emmett, Idaho and graduated from Emmett High School in 1972.

Career 

During the 1981 and 1985 legislative sessions, Little represented his father, David Little, in the Senate on a temporary appointment due to illness, during which time he served on the Finance and Resources Committees. Little also managed his family's ranching operation, Little Land and Livestock, for almost 30 years until his son, David, became manager in 2009 when Little was appointed lieutenant governor. He continues to work as the head of Little Enterprises, Inc. (a diversified farming and cattle operation), and is a member of the board of directors of Performance Design Inc., a small Boise-based manufacturing company.

Little has also been involved in a variety of private organizations and companies based in Idaho and the Mountain West. He is a former chairman of the Idaho Association of Commerce and Industry (IACI), "The Voice of Business in Idaho", and was a member of its board for 20 years (1981–2001). Little is also the former vice-chairman of the Idaho Community Foundation and the Emmett Public School Foundation, and the former director of the Idaho Wool Growers Association and the University of Idaho Foundation. He has also served in the past on the boards of directors of High Country News, Home Federal Bank, a small Idaho-based regional bank recently acquired by Bank of the Cascades, and the Idaho Foundation for Excellence in Education.

State senator (2001–2009) 
Governor Dirk Kempthorne appointed Little to fill a state senate vacancy in May 2001. He represented what was at the time District 8, which covered a part of Gem County surrounding and north of Emmett, all of Boise, Valley, and Adams Counties, and the southern portion of Idaho County.

After a change in district boundaries due to redistricting in 2001–02, Little was elected in the fall of 2002 to District 11, which then encompassed all of Gem County and the northern portion of Canyon County, including the communities of Middleton and Parma. He was reelected senator from the 11th legislative district four times. Little was also elected in 2003 by his Republican peers to the party leadership position of Majority Caucus Chair, which he held until 2009.

Committee assignments 
 Agricultural Affairs 2002
 Resources and Environment 2002
 State Affairs 2003–2009
 Resources & Environment 2003–2009
 Transportation 2003–2009
 Economic Outlook 
 Revenue Assessment
State Senator from District 11: 2002 results

State Senator from District 11: 2004 results

State Senate from District 11: 2006 results

State Senate from District 11: 2008 results

Lieutenant governor of Idaho (2009–2019)

Appointment, election and reelection 
In January 2009, Governor Butch Otter appointed Little to the office of lieutenant governor to fill the vacancy left by former Lieutenant Governor Jim Risch's election to the U.S. Senate in 2008. Little was sworn in by Otter on January 6, 2009, and confirmed by unanimous consent when the Idaho Senate convened on January 12.

Little was elected lieutenant governor in 2010, defeating two opponents in the primary election and two opponents from the Democratic and Constitution parties in the general election. He was reelected in 2014.

Economic development and trade missions 
Little focused on economic development as lieutenant governor, helping persuade energy bar producer Clif Bar to build a new food manufacturing plant in Idaho in 2013.

Little also took part in and led several trade missions. He led a Friendship Mission to Basque Country in Spain in 2010, during which he met President of the Basque Government Patxi López. During this meeting, Little and López agreed to establish a Basque Economic Development Office in Boise that "would provide resources and services for Idaho and Basque companies to ease collaboration on research, sales and collaborative programs." Little later signed the Euskadi-Idaho Friendship Agreement, which affirms the friendship and cultural affinity between the Basque Country and Idaho, which has the largest Basque community outside Spain.

Little was also a member of a 2011 Idaho trade delegation that traveled to Mexico and Brazil. After the trade mission, he said, "we found tremendous interest and opportunities in both countries for Idaho products and services … This trip strengthened key trade relationships and established new customers for Idaho businesses." The Idaho Department of Commerce estimated that the mission resulted in sales of more than $30 million.

Legislation 
In the 2014 legislative session, Little sponsored Senate Bill 1354, an anti-"patent troll" bill. The bill protects companies from abusive or "bad faith assertions of patent infringement" to collect an extortionate licensing fee.

Governor of Idaho (2019–present)

2018 election
In June 2016, Little announced his candidacy for the Idaho gubernatorial election in 2018. He said that Idaho National Laboratory would be a priority if he became governor.

Little was endorsed by incumbent Governor Otter, former governors Dirk Kempthorne and Phil Batt, and U.S. Senator Jim Risch.

During his campaign, Little called for a phased-in $350 million reduction in the state income tax and the elimination of the Idaho grocery tax.

Little won the Idaho Republican Party primary, beating both U.S. Representative Raúl Labrador and businessman Tommy Ahlquist with 37.3% of the vote. In the general election in November, he defeated state Representative Paulette Jordan, the Idaho Democratic Party nominee, by over 130,000 votes.

2022 reelection 
In March 2022, Little filed papers to run for a second term in office, having announced his intention to run the previous month. He won the Republican nomination in May, defeating Lieutenant Governor Janice McGeachin.

The Democratic nominee in the race was Stephen Heidt. At the same time, an anti-government activist, Ammon Bundy, ran in the race as an independent. Little easily won the November 8 election, certifying the win in every county except Blaine County, which Heidt won.

Tenure 
In March 2020, Little gained attention for signing two bills into law that addressed transgender people. The first bans transgender women and girls from competing in women's sports, citing possible unfair physical advantages. The second bill, HB 509, bans transgender people from changing the sex on their birth certificates.

In 2021, Little signed legislation that raised signature requirements for ballot initiatives. That year, he also signed legislation that would permit harvesting up to 90% of the state's estimated 1,500 wolves to the minimum level of 150 as set by Idaho’s wolf conservation and management plan; the legislation was backed by the ranching sector of Idaho as well as many in the hunting and fishing community, but strongly opposed by environmental advocates.

Political positions

Abortion 
In late April 2021, Little signed House Bill 366, effectively prohibiting abortions after about six weeks of pregnancy, making exceptions for victims of rape, incest, and for medical emergencies. He also said, "We should never relent in our efforts to protect the lives of the preborn" and "Hundreds and hundreds of babies lose their lives every year in Idaho due to abortion, an absolute tragedy."

In March 2022, Little signed Senate Bill 1309 modeled after the Texas Heartbeat Act that prohibited abortions after about six weeks of pregnancy. The bill made exceptions for victims of rape, incest, and for medical emergencies. The Idaho Supreme Court later temporarily blocked the law.

Gun control 
Little opposes gun control. In May 2021, he signed a bill that would thwart nearly a half-dozen of executive orders from President Joe Biden combating gun control. Little has an A+ rating from the National Rifle Association for his record on Second Amendment rights.

LGBT rights 
Little opposes LGBT rights. In 2006, he voted to propose 2006 Idaho Amendment 2, which banned same-sex marriages or civil unions being performed in the state of Idaho. During his campaign for governor, Little said, "marriage is the union between a man and a woman". In March 2020, he signed both House Bill 500 and House Bill 509, which ban transgender people who identify as female from playing on athletic teams that don't align with their sex-at-birth and ban transgender people from changing their gender mark on their birth certificate.

Marijuana 
In a January 2019 interview, Little expressed opposition to legalizing recreational marijuana. He had expressed skepticism about legalizing medical marijuana for patients.

When being asked about marijuana legalization in April 2019, Little said: “If Idahoans want legal marijuana, they elected the wrong guy as governor.” NORML, a group advocating the legalization of marijuana, gave Little an F rating for his policies about reforming marijuana laws.

In February 2021, Little signed Senate Bill 1017, which raises the legal THC limit in cannabidiol (CBD) products from 0% to 0.1% THC. The law went into effect on July 1, 2021.

In April 2021, Little signed a bill that would legalize the cultivation and transportation of hemp in Idaho with up to 0.3% THC in it, making Idaho the final state to do so, but the bill would prohibit the sale of hemp products containing any THC.

Electoral history

Personal life 
Little married Teresa Soulen of Weiser in May 1978, and they have two sons and five grandchildren.

References

External links

Official government site
Official campaign Site

|-

|-

|-

|-

|-

|-

|-

1954 births
Living people
21st-century American politicians
Republican Party governors of Idaho
Republican Party Idaho state senators
Lieutenant Governors of Idaho
People from Gem County, Idaho
Ranchers from Idaho
University of Idaho alumni